Lardon Chase is a  biological Site of Special Scientific Interest in Streatley in Berkshire. It is in the North Wessex Downs, which is an Area of Outstanding Natural Beauty, and is part of the Lardon Chase, the Holies and Lough Down National Trust property.

This sloping site on the Berkshire Downs is unimproved chalk grassland. Steep areas on thin soils are grazed by rabbits. The site is particularly important for its butterfly species, including chalkhill blue, marbled white and the rare adonis blue at its last known locality in the county.

There is access from Streatley Hill.

References

 
Sites of Special Scientific Interest in Berkshire